Labé (Pular 𞤆𞤵𞤤𞤢𞤪:𞤂𞤢𞤦𞤫) is the main city and administrative capital of the Fouta Djallon region of Guinea. It has a population of about 200,000. It is the second largest city in the country after the capital Conakry in term of economic importance.

History
The city was founded around 1755 by Karamoko Alpha mo Labé, a Muslim  religious leader who introduced Islam in the region in the 18th century and who also founded a theocratic state in Fouta Djallon.

The city was the capital of the Diwal/province of Labe prior to French colonisation. It was home to Muslim leaders and scholars who resisted colonisation, such as Alpha Yaya Diallo. Labe is the most important city in the Moyenne (Middle) Guinea region also known as Fouta Djallon. Labe is considered as a major cultural and religious center in West Africa, especially among the Fulani people. Many Muslim scholars made Labe a famous learning place in Islamic studies. The most prominent of the erudites being Alfa Oumarou Rafiou (Dara Labe), Thierno Doura Sombili, Thierno Diawo Pellel, Thierno Aliou Bhouba Dian.

Economy
Labé is an important commercial centre in the region, arising out of its strategic geographical position between several other countries. Traders from nearby regions such as Pita, Tougué, Koubia, Lélouma, Mali Yemberin and other countries including Mali, Senegal, the Gambia and Sierra Leone gather in Labé. Its central market is the second largest in the country after the Madina market in Conakry. Trade or commerce has become the main activity in the city, but Labe also has a small manufacturing industry consisting mainly of shoe making, textile, carpentry, blacksmithing...
It is known for weaving and honey.  The city also benefits from a considerable diaspora whose repatriated income contributes significantly to infrastructural development in Labé and helps to overcome the region's relatively poorer revenue stream. Merchants from the city dominate the informal economy in most Guinean cities and are also economically active in cities further afield, such as Dakar, Bamako, Abidjan, Bissau and Freetown.

The city also has a museum, while the Saala Falls and Mount Kolima lie nearby.

The town is served by Tata Airport. A jet-capable airport near Labé was built by Cuban engineers in 1973. Currently the airport remains unused due to the lack of airline traffic connecting the different regions and major cities in Guinea.

The city has a sizable stadium (stade Saifoulaye Diallo) which hosts soccer/football games played by the local club Fello Star. However the sport facility is poorly maintained and kept.

Climate
It is as hot by day as the coast of Guinea all year round, but cold to comfortable at night due to lower heat storage in thinner air. About  of rain fall annually, almost all between late April and early November.

Notable people
Siradiou Diallo (1936–2004) – politician and journalist
Alpha Oumar Barou Diallo – politician
Cellou Dalein Diallo – politician and economist
Koumanthio Zeinab Diallo – poet, novelist and playwright
Elhadj Thierno Abdourahmane Bah (1916 - 2013) - Poet and imam of Labe mosque
Saidou Malea Diallo - Professor
Ibrahima Caba Bah - Professor
Karamoko Alfa Mo Labe - Founder of the town 
Elhadj Thierno Badrou Bah - Current imam of Labe

References

Sub-prefectures of the Labé Region